This is a list of results of the rugby league team the New Zealand Warriors from their debut season in the Winfield Cup in 1995 to present day in the National Rugby League. The Warriors were known as the Auckland Warriors until 2000.

Australian Rugby League

1995

Winfield Cup
 Round 1 vs Brisbane Broncos, lost 22-25, Mt Smart Stadium
 Round 2 vs Illawarra Steelers, lost 28-40, WIN Stadium
 Round 3 vs Western Suburbs Magpies, won 46-12, Mt Smart Stadium
Round 4 vs North Sydney Bears, lost 10-48, North Sydney Oval
Round 5 vs Manly Sea Eagles, lost 14-26, Mt Smart Stadium
Round 6 vs Illawarra Steelers, won 38-12, Mt Smart Stadium
Round 7 vs Parramatta Eels, won 40-4, Parramatta Stadium
Round 8 vs Sydney Roosters, won 26-22, Mt Smart Stadium
Round 9 vs Newcastle Knights, lost 6-48, EnergyAustralia Stadium
Round 10 vs Cronulla Sharks, won 23-18, Toyota Park
Round 11 vs Balmain Tigers, won 36-12, Mt Smart Stadium
Round 12 vs Penrith Panthers, lost 16-34, Mt Smart Stadium
Round 13 vs Western Suburbs Magpies, won 16-12, Campbelltown Sports Ground
Round 14 vs South Sydney Rabbitohs, won 38-20, Sydney Football Stadium
Round 15 vs Gold Coast Seagulls, won 44-16, Mt Smart Stadium
Round 16 vs Western Reds, won 34-10, Mt Smart Stadium
Round 17 vs South Queensland Crushers, won 22-10, Suncorp Stadium
Round 18 vs North Queensland Cowboys, won 28-10, Dairy Farmers Stadium
Round 19 vs St George Dragons, lost 14-47, Mt Smart Stadium
Round 20 vs Canterbury Bulldogs, won 29-8, Parramatta Stadium
Round 21 vs Canberra Raiders, lost 8-15, Mt Smart Stadium
Round 22 vs Brisbane Broncos, lost 6-44, Queensland Sport and Athletics Centre

1996

Optus Cup
Round 1 vs Brisbane Broncos, won by forfeit, Queensland Sport and Athletics Centre
Round 2 vs Illawarra Steelers, won 18-10, Mt Smart Stadium
Round 3 vs Western Suburbs Magpies, lost 8-22, Campbelltown Sports Ground
Round 4 vs North Sydney Bears, won 12-8, Mt Smart Stadium
Round 5 vs Manly Sea Eagles, lost 10-22, Brookvale Oval
Round 6 vs Illawarra Steelers, won 30-20, WIN Stadium
Round 7 vs Parramatta Eels, won 28-4, Parramatta Stadium
Round 8 vs Sydney Roosters, lost 16-28, Sydney Football Stadium
Round 9 vs Newcastle Knights, lost 18-22, Mt Smart Stadium
Round 10 vs Cronulla Sharks, lost 24-28, Mt Smart Stadium
Round 11 vs Balmain Tigers, lost 22-34, AMI Stadium
Round 12 vs Penrith Panthers, won 26-16, CUA Stadium
Round 13 vs Western Suburbs Magpies, won 32-16, Mt Smart Stadium
Round 14 vs South Sydney Rabbitohs, won 24-10, Mt Smart Stadium
Round 15 vs Gold Coast Chargers, won 28-14, Carrara Stadium
Round 16 vs Western Reds, lost 12-32, WACA Ground
Round 17 vs South Queensland Crushers, won 16-12, Mt Smart Stadium
Round 18 vs North Queensland Cowboys, won 52-6, Mt Smart Stadium
Round 19 vs St George Dragons, lost 6-35, Oki Jubilee Stadium
Round 20 vs Canterbury Bulldogs, lost 18-20, Mt Smart Stadium
Round 21 vs Canberra Raiders, lost 6-30, Canberra Stadium
Round 22 vs Brisbane Broncos, lost 6-38, Mt Smart Stadium

Super League

1997

Telstra Cup
Round 1 vs Brisbane Broncos, lost 2-14, Queensland Sport and Athletics Centre
Round 2 vs Hunter Mariners, won 18-14, Mt Smart Stadium
Round 3 vs Cronulla Sharks, lost 8-34, Toyota Park
Round 4 vs Adelaide Rams, lost 12-16, Mt Smart Stadium
Round 5 vs Penrith Panthers, won 16-14, Mt Smart Stadium
Round 6 vs Canberra Raiders, won 31-24, Canberra Stadium
Round 7 vs Hunter Mariners, lost 10-18, Breakers Stadium
Round 8 vs Canterbury Bulldogs, lost 24-38, Mt Smart Stadium
Round 9 vs North Queensland Cowboys, won 30-22, Dairy Farmers Stadium
Round 10 vs Brisbane Broncos, lost 18-34, Mt Smart Stadium
Round 11 vs Canberra Raiders, lost 10-20, Mt Smart Stadium
Round 12 vs Western Reds, lost 12-24, WACA Ground
Round 13 vs Penrith Panthers, lost 22-26, CUA Stadium
Round 14 vs Cronulla Sharks, won 11-8, Mt Smart Stadium
Round 15 vs Adelaide Rams, won 18-8, Adelaide Oval
Round 16 vs Canterbury Bulldogs, lost 18-40, Belmore Sports Ground
Round 17 vs Western Reds, won 30-22, Mt Smart Stadium
Round 18 vs North Queensland Cowboys, won 50-22, Mt Smart Stadium

World Club Challenge
Round 1 vs St. Helens, won 42-14, Knowsley Road
Round 2 vs Bradford Bulls, won 20-16, Grattan Stadium
Round 3 vs Warrington Wolves, won 56-28, Wilderspool Stadium
Round 4 vs Bradford Bulls, won 64-14, Mt Smart Stadium
Round 5 vs St Helens, won 70-6, Mt Smart Stadium
Round 6 vs Warrington Wolves, won 16-4, AMI Stadium
Quarter Final vs Bradford Bulls, won 62-14, Mt Smart Stadium
Semi Final vs Brisbane Broncos, lost 16-22, Queensland Sport and Athletics Centre

National Rugby League

1998

Telstra Premiership
Round 1 vs South Sydney Rabbitohs, lost 18-24, Mt Smart Stadium
Round 2 vs Newcastle Knights, lost 4-33, EnergyAustralia Stadium
Round 3 vs Sydney Roosters, won 25-14, Mt Smart Stadium
Round 4 vs St George Dragons, lost 24-28, Oki Jubilee Stadium
Round 5 vs Melbourne Storm, won 16-12, Mt Smart Stadium
Round 6 vs North Sydney Bears, lost 26-44, North Sydney Oval
Round 7 vs Newcastle Knights, lost 14-38, Mt Smart Stadium
Round 8 vs Sydney Roosters, lost 4-22, Sydney Football Stadium
Round 9 vs Cronulla Sharks, lost 8-20, Mt Smart Stadium
Round 10 vs Canterbury Bulldogs, won 20-6, Belmore Sports Ground
Round 11 vs Canberra Raiders, won 25-14, Mt Smart Stadium
Round 12 vs Parramatta Eels, lost 6-14, Parramatta Stadium
Round 13 vs Penrith Panthers, won 15-14, Mt Smart Stadium
Round 14 vs Western Suburbs Magpies, lost 16-18, Campbelltown Sports Ground
Round 15 vs St George Dragons, won 31-14, Mt Smart Stadium
Round 16 vs Melbourne Storm, won 24-21, Olympic Park Stadium
Round 17 vs Illawarra Steelers, lost 17-14, Mt Smart Stadium
Round 18 vs Gold Coast, lost 18-31, Carrara Stadium
Round 19 vs Balmain Tigers, won 21-20, Mt Smart Stadium
Round 20 vs Adelaide Rams, lost 20-22, Hindmarsh Stadium
Round 21 vs North Queensland Cowboys, won 34-18, Mt Smart Stadium
Round 22 vs South Sydney Rabbitohs, lost 18-20, Sydney Football Stadium
Round 23 vs Brisbane Broncos, lost 4-16, Queensland Sport and Athletics Centre
Round 24 vs Manly Sea Eagles, lost 12-38, Mt Smart Stadium

1999

Round 1 vs Sydney Roosters, won 26-16, Sydney Football Stadium
Round 2 vs North Sydney Bears, lost 18-22, Mt Smart Stadium
Round 3 vs Manly Sea Eagles, won 36-10, Brookvale Oval
Round 4 vs Sydney Roosters, lost 14-28, Mt Smart Stadium
Round 5 vs Balmain Tigers, lost 8-17, Leichhardt Oval
Round 6 vs Melbourne Storm, lost 10-38, Mt Smart Stadium
Round 7 vs North Queensland Cowboys, lost 0-24, Mt Smart Stadium
Round 8 vs Bye
Round 9 vs South Sydney Rabbitohs, lost 8-12, Mt Smart Stadium
Round 10 vs Parramatta Eels, lost 6-28, Parramatta Stadium
Round 11 vs Canberra Raiders, won 32-30, Mt Smart Stadium
Round 12 vs Canterbury Bulldogs, lost 28-24, Telstra Stadium
Round 13 vs Parramatta Eels, lost 18-25, Mt Smart Stadium
Round 14 vs Bye
Round 15 vs Penrith Panthers, lost 20-34, CUA Stadium
Round 16 vs Canterbury Bulldogs, won 30-10, Mt Smart Stadium
Round 17 vs Balmain Tigers, won 22-4, Mt Smart Stadium
Round 18 vs Canberra Raiders, lost 22-46, Canberra Stadium
Round 19 vs Brisbane Broncos, lost 16-24, Queensland Sport and Athletics Centre
Round 20 vs Cronulla Sharks, lost 20-22, Mt Smart Stadium
Round 21 vs South Sydney Rabbitohs, won 20-16, Sydney Football Stadium
Round 22 vs Melbourne Storm, lost 14-16, Olympic Park Stadium
Round 23 vs St George Illawarra Dragons, won 32-18, Mt Smart Stadium
Round 24 vs North Queensland Cowboys, won 40-14, Dairy Farmers Stadium
Round 25 vs Newcastle Knights, won 42-0, Mt Smart Stadium
Round 26 vs Western Suburbs Magpies, won 60-16, Campbelltown Sports Ground

2000

Round 1 vs Melbourne Storm, won 14-6, Mt Smart Stadium
Round 2 vs Wests Tigers, lost 16-17, Leichhardt Oval
Round 3 vs Brisbane Broncos, lost 10-28, Mt Smart Stadium
Round 4 vs Newcastle Knights, draw 18-18, Mt Smart Stadium
Round 5 vs Canberra Raiders, lost 12-56, Canberra Stadium
Round 6 vs Penrith Panthers, lost 24-31, CUA Stadium
Round 7 vs St George Illawarra Dragons, lost 8-36, Mt Smart Stadium
Round 8 vs Sydney Roosters, won 26-22, Mt Smart Stadium
Round 9 vs Parramatta Eels, lost 22-24, Parramatta Stadium
Round 10 vs Canterbury Bulldogs, draw 18-18, Telstra Stadium
Round 11 vs North Queensland Cowboys, won 18-12, Dairy Farmers Stadium
Round 12 vs Cronulla Sharks, won 24-20, Mt Smart Stadium
Round 13 vs Wests Tigers, lost 4-30, Mt Smart Stadium
Round 14 vs St George Illawarra Dragons, lost 0-54, WIN Stadium	
Round 15 vs Northern Eagles, won 18-14, Brookvale Oval
Round 16 vs Canterbury Bulldogs, won 24-12, Mt Smart Stadium
Round 17 vs Newcastle Knights, lost 12-30, EnergyAustralia Stadium
Round 18 vs Canberra Raiders, lost 6-13, Mt Smart Stadium
Round 19 vs Penrith Panthers, lost 20-24, Mt Smart Stadium
Round 20 vs Melbourne Storm, lost 10-56, Olympic Park Stadium
Round 21 vs Sydney Roosters, lost 4-36, Sydney Football Stadium
Round 22 vs Parramatta Eels, lost 10-11, Mt Smart Stadium
Round 23 vs Cronulla Sharks, lost 12-22, Toyota Park
Round 24 vs North Queensland Cowboys, won 44-12, Mt Smart Stadium
Round 25 vs Brisbane Broncos, lost 20-38, Queensland Sport and Athletics Centre
Round 26 vs Northern Eagles, won 32-22, Mt Smart Stadium

2001

Round 1 vs Canberra Raiders, lost 8-24, Mt Smart Stadium
Round 2 vs Northern Eagles, won 24-16, Central Coast Stadium
Round 3 vs Wests Tigers, lost 10-29, Campbelltown Sports Ground
Round 4 vs St George Illwarra Dragons, won 34-8, Mt Smart Stadium
Round 5 vs Parramatta Eels, lost 24-30, Parramatta Stadium
Round 6 vs Brisbane Broncos, won 13-12, Mt Smart Stadium
Round 7 vs Newcastle Knights, lost 24-45, EnergyAustralia Stadium
Round 8 vs Canterbury Bulldogs, draw 24-24, Westpac Stadium
Round 9 vs Penrith Panthers, won 52-8, Mt Smart Stadium
Round 10 vs Cronulla Sharks, lost 16-26, Toyota Park
Round 11 vs Sydney Roosters, won 42-30, Sydney Football Stadium
Round 12 vs Melbourne Storm, lost 20-40, Mt Smart Stadium
Round 13 vs North Queensland Cowboys, lost 18-35, Dairy Farmers Stadium
Round 14 vs Canberra Raiders, won 22-10, Manuka Oval
Round 15 vs Northern Eagles, lost 30-34, Mt Smart Stadium
Round 16 vs Wests Tigers, lost 16-21, Mt Smart Stadium
Round 17 vs St George Illawarra Dragons, lost 18-38, WIN Stadium
Round 18 vs Parramatta Eels, won 29-18, Mt Smart Stadium
Round 19 vs Brisbane Broncos, lost 12-48, Carrara Stadium
Round 20 vs Newcastle Knights, lost 30-37, Mt Smart Stadium
Round 21 vs Canterbury Bulldogs, won 34-8, Mt Smart Stadium
Round 22 vs Penrith Panthers, won 48-32, CUA Stadium
Round 23 vs Cronulla Sharks, won 30-0, Mt Smart Stadium
Round 24 vs Sydney Roosters, won 14-8, Mt Smart Stadium
Round 25 vs Melbourne Storm, draw 24-24, Telstra Dome
Round 26 vs North Queensland Cowboys, lost 18-30, Mt Smart Stadium
Finals Week One vs Parramatta Eels, lost 12-56, Parramatta Stadium

2002

Round 1 vs Bye
Round 2 vs Sydney Roosters, won 21-14, Mt Smart Stadium
Round 3 vs Newcastle Knights, lost 14-32, Mt Smart Stadium
Round 4 vs North Queensland Cowboys, won 50-20, Dairy Farmers Stadium
Round 5 vs Northern Eagles, won 68-10, Mt Smart Stadium
Round 6 vs Canterbury Bulldogs, lost 20-28, Westpac Stadium
Round 7 vs Melbourne Storm, won 20-10, Mt Smart Stadium
Round 8 vs Wests Tigers, won 36-14, Campbelltown Sports Ground
Round 9 vs South Sydney Rabbitohs, won 25-18, Mt Smart Stadium
Round 10 vs Newcastle Knights, won 34-12, EnergyAustralia Stadium
Round 11 vs Melbourne Storm, won 28-12, Olympic Park Stadium
Round 12 vs Cronulla Sharks, won 42-20, Mt Smart Stadium
Round 13 vs North Queensland Cowboys, won 34-6, Mt Smart Stadium
Round 14 vs South Sydney Rabbitohs, won 46-10, Sydney Football Stadium
Round 15 vs St George Illawarra Dragons, lost 22-32, Mt Smart Stadium
Round 16 vs Brisbane Broncos, won 26-16, Queensland Sport and Athletics Centre
Round 17 vs Cronulla Sharks, lost 24-36, Toyota Park
Round 18 vs Bye
Round 19 vs Parramatta Eels, won 26-10, Mt Smart Stadium
Round 20 vs Canberra Raiders, lost 30-38, Canberra Stadium
Round 21 vs Penrith Panthers, won 38-24, CUA Stadium
Round 22 vs Canterbury Bulldogs, won 22-14, Mt Smart Stadium
Round 23 vs Brisbane Broncos, won 18-4, Mt Smart Stadium
Round 24 vs Sydney Roosters, lost 0-44,Sydney Football Stadium
Round 25 vs Northern Eagles, lost 16-18, Brookvale Oval
Round 26 vs Wests Tigers, won 28-12, Mt Smart Stadium
Finals Week One vs Canberra Raiders, won 36-20, Mt Smart Stadium
Finals Week Two vs Bye
Finals Week Three vs Cronulla Sharks, won 16-10, Telstra Stadium
Grand Final vs Sydney Roosters, lost 8-30, Telstra Stadium

2003

Round 1 vs Newcastle Knights, lost 26-36, Mt Smart Stadium
Round 2 vs Canterbury Bulldogs, won 24-20, Mt Smart Stadium
Round 3 vs Manly Sea Eagles, won 20-16, Brookvale Oval
Round 4 vs South Sydney Rabbitohs, won 38-16, Mt Smart Stadium
Round 5 vs Brisbane Broncos, won 32-12, Queensland Sport and Athletics Centre
Round 6 vs North Queensland Cowboys, won 30-24, Mt Smart Stadium
Round 7 vs Penrith Panthers, lost 14-28, Mt Smart Stadium
Round 8 vs Canterbury Bulldogs, lost 12-18, Westpac Stadium
Round 9 vs Parramatta Eels, won 18-16, Mt Smart Stadium
Round 10 vs Bye
Round 11 vs Canberra Raiders, lost 10-18, Westpac Stadium
Round 12 vs Penrith Panthers, lost 12-34, CUA Stadium
Round 13 vs Cronulla Sharks, won 23-6, Mt Smart Stadium
Round 14 vs Parramatta Eels, lost 26-28, Parramatta Stadium
Round 15 vs Canberra Raiders, won 26-18, Mt Smart Stadium
Round 16 vs South Sydney Rabbitohs, won 31-30 (a.e.t), Sydney Football Stadium
Round 17 vs North Queensland Cowboys, lost 10-30, Dairy Farmers Stadium
Round 18 vs Manly Sea Eagles, won 20-12, Mt Smart Stadium
Round 19 vs Cronulla Sharks, won 31-24, Toyota Park
Round 20 vs Bye
Round 21 vs Melbourne Storm, lost 12-14, Mt Smart Stadium
Round 22 vs St George Illawarra Dragons, won 30-20, Oki Jubilee Stadium
Round 23 vs Newcastle Knights, lost 20-36, EnergyAustralia Stadium
Round 24 vs Brisbane Broncos, won 22-14, Mt Smart Stadium
Round 25 vs Sydney Roosters, won 26-24, Sydney Football Stadium
Round 26 vs Wests Tigers, won 32-16, Mt Smart Stadium
Finals Week One vs Canterbury Bulldogs, won 48-22, Sydney Showground
Finals Week Two vs Canberra Raiders, won 17-16, Sydney Football Stadium
Finals Week Three vs Penrith Panthers, lost 20-28, Telstra Stadium

2004

Round 1 vs Brisbane Broncos, lost 20-28, Suncorp Stadium
Round 2 vs St George Illawarra Dragons, lost 10-16, Mt Smart Stadium
Round 3 vs Penrith Panthers, lost 22-42, Mt Smart Stadium
Round 4 vs Manly Sea Eagles, won 28-10, Brookvale Oval
Round 5 vs Newcastle Knights, lost 20-34, Mt Smart Stadium
Round 6 vs Canterbury Bulldogs, lost 18-24, Westpac Stadium
Round 7 vs Bye
Round 8 vs Melbourne Storm, won 20-14, Mt Smart Stadium
Round 9 vs North Queensland Cowboys, lost 8-16, Dairy Farmers Stadium
Round 10 vs Manly Sea Eagles, lost 20-42, Mt Smart Stadium
Round 11 vs South Sydney Rabbitohs, won 26-12, Sydney Football Stadium
Round 12 vs Sydney Roosters, lost 6-58, Sydney Football Stadium
Round 13 vs Canberra Raiders, won 20-14, Mt Smart Stadium
Round 14 vs Wests Tigers, lost 4-50, AMI Stadium
Round 15 vs North Queensland Cowboys, lost 26-28 (a.e.t), Mt Smart Stadium
Round 16 vs Melbourne Storm, lost 6-42, Olympic Park Stadium
Round 17 vs Parramatta Eels, won 20-10, Mt Smart Stadium
Round 18 vs Cronulla Sharks, lost 14-22, Toyota Park
Round 19 vs South Sydney Rabbitohs, won 34-20, Mt Smart Stadium
Round 20 vs Canberra Raiders, lost 29-30 (a.e.t), Mt Smart Stadium
Round 21 vs Bye
Round 22 vs Brisbane Broncos, lost 14-21, Mt Smart Stadium
Round 23 vs St George Illawarra Dragons, lost 10-28, WIN Stadium
Round 24 vs Parramatta Eels, lost 18-48, Parramatta Stadium
Round 25 vs Sydney Roosters, lost 24-30, Mt Smart Stadium
Round 26 vs Canterbury Bulldogs, lost 10-54, Mt Smart Stadium

2005

Round 1 vs Manly Sea Eagles, lost 20-26, Mt Smart Stadium
Round 2 vs Brisbane Broncos, won 24-12, Suncorp Stadium
Round 3 vs North Queensland Cowboys, lost 22-32, Mt Smart Stadium
Round 4 vs South Sydney Rabbitohs, won 46-14, Mt Smart Stadium
Round 5 vs Wests Tigers, lost 6-24, AMI Stadium
Round 6 vs Newcastle Knights, won 30-26, EnergyAustralia Stadium
Round 7 vs Bye
Round 8 vs Penrith Panthers, lost 14-16, Mt Smart Stadium
Round 9 vs Cronulla Sharks, lost 24-28, Members Equity Stadium
Round 10 vs Sydney Roosters, lost 6-10, Mt Smart Stadium
Round 11 vs South Sydney Rabbitohs, won 34-16, North Sydney Oval
Round 12 vs Wests Tigers, won 21-4, Mt Smart Stadium
Round 13 vs St George Illawarra Dragons, lost 18-32, WIN Stadium
Round 14 vs Melbourne Storm, won 24-16, Mt Smart Stadium
Round 15 vs Parramatta Eels, lost 18-28, Waikato Stadium
Round 16 vs Brisbane Broncos, won 30-18, Mt Smart Stadium
Round 17 vs North Queensland Cowboys, lost 16-24, Dairy Farmers Stadium
Round 18 vs Canterbury Bulldogs, lost 24-26, Mt Smart Stadium
Round 19 vs Sydney Roosters, won 24-22, Sydney Football Stadium
Round 20 vs Canberra Raiders, won 24-16, Mt Smart Stadium
Round 21 vs Penrith Panthers, lost 34-42, CUA Stadium
Round 22 vs Parramatta Eels, lost 20-38, Mt Smart Stadium
Round 23 vs Melbourne Storm, lost 10-22, Olympic Park Stadium
Round 24 vs Newcastle Knights, lost 4-16, Mt Smart Stadium
Round 25 vs Manly Sea Eagles, won 22-20, Brookvale Oval
Round 26 vs Bye

2006

Round 1 vs Melbourne Storm, lost 16-22, Mt Smart Stadium
Round 2 vs Parramatta Eels, lost 14-22, Waikato Stadium
Round 3 vs Wests Tigers, won 26-10, AMI Stadium
Round 4 vs Newcastle Knights, won 26-22, EnergyAustralia Stadium
Round 5 vs Manly Sea Eagles, lost 8-22, Mt Smart Stadium
Round 6 vs Canberra Raiders, lost 14-18, Canberra Stadium
Round 7 vs South Sydney Rabbitohs, won 46-14, Mt Smart Stadium
Round 8 vs Canterbury Bulldogs lost 16-30, Mt Smart Stadium
Round 9 vs Bye
Round 10 vs St George Illawarra, lost 16-22, WIN Stadium
Round 11 vs Wests Tigers, won 34-12, Mt Smart Stadium
Round 12 vs Cronulla Sharks, lost 20-34, Toyota Park
Round 13 vs Brisbane Broncos, lost 18-23, Mt Smart Stadium
Round 14 vs Sydney Roosters, won 22-12, Sydney Football Stadium
Round 15 vs Newcastle Knights, won 30-18, Mt Smart Stadium
Round 16 vs South Sydney Rabbitohs, won 66-0, Telstra Stadium
Round 17 vs Penrith Panthers, won 28-22, Mt Smart Stadium
Round 18 vs Canterbury Bulldogs, lost 18-22 (a.e.t), Telstra Stadium
Round 19 vs Parramatta Eels, lost 12-20, Mt Smart Stadium
Round 20 vs Bye
Round 21 vs Penrith Panthers, lost 6-36, CUA Stadium
Round 22 vs Cronulla Sharks, won 12-10, Mt Smart Stadium
Round 23 vs North Queensland Cowboys, won 26-0, Mt Smart Stadium
Round 24 vs Melbourne Storm, won 24-20, Olympic Park Stadium
Round 25 vs Sydney Roosters, won 42-16, Mt Smart Stadium
Round 26 vs Brisbane Broncos, lost 12-36, Suncorp Stadium

2007

Round 1 vs Parramatta Eels, won 34-18, Mt Smart Stadium
Round 2 vs Brisbane Broncos, won 24-14, Mt Smart Stadium
Round 3 vs Melbourne Storm, lost 12-30, Olympic Park Stadium
Round 4 vs Manly Sea Eagles, lost 10-13, Brookvale Oval
Round 5 vs North Queensland Cowboys, won 34-14, Mt Smart Stadium
Round 6 vs Bye
Round 7 vs South Sydney Rabbitohs, won 18-16, Telstra Stadium
Round 8 vs Cronulla Sharks, lost 20-22, Mt Smart Stadium
Round 9 vs Newcastle Knights, lost 18-24, Energy Australia Stadium
Round 10 vs Wests Tigers, lost 26-30, Mt Smart Stadium
Round 11 vs Parramatta Eels, lost 6-30, Parramatta Stadium
Round 12 vs Canterbury Bulldogs, lost 20-40, Mt Smart Stadium
Round 13 vs Melbourne Storm, lost 2-4, Mt Smart Stadium
Round 14 vs Cronulla Sharks, won 12-2, Toyota Park
Round 15 vs Penrith Panthers, won 54-14, Mt Smart Stadium
Round 16 vs Gold Coast Titans, won 22-6, Carrara Stadium
Round 17 vs North Queensland Cowboys, lost 12-18, Dairy Farmers Stadium
Round 18 vs St George Illawarra Dragons, won 44-16, Mt Smart Stadium
Round 19 vs Wests Tigers, won 28-16, Campbelltown Sports Ground
Round 20 vs Newcastle Knights, won 52-10, Mt Smart Stadium
Round 21 vs Sydney Roosters, draw 31-31 (a.e.t), Sydney Football Stadium
Round 22 vs Gold Coast Titans, won 30-6, Mt Smart Stadium
Round 23 vs Canberra Raiders, lost 24-26, Canberra Stadium
Round 24 vs Manly Sea Eagles, won 36-14, Mt Smart Stadium
Round 25 vs Penrith Panthers, won 24-20, CUA Stadium
Finals Week One vs Parramatta Eels, lost 10-12, Mt Smart Stadium
Finals Week Two vs North Queensland Cowboys, lost 12-49, Dairy Farmers Stadium

2008

Round 1 vs Melbourne Storm, lost 18-32, Telstra Dome
Round 2 vs Parramatta Eels, won 30-16, Mt Smart Stadium
Round 3 vs Manly Sea Eagles, lost 6-52, Brookvale Oval
Round 4 vs Newcastle Knights, won 26-20, Mt Smart Stadium
Round 5 vs Canterbury Bulldogs, won 36-16, Mt Smart Stadium
Round 6 vs North Queensland Cowboys, lost 20-48, Dairy Farmers Stadium
Round 7 vs Gold Coast Titans, lost 24-36, Skilled Park
Round 8 vs Canberra Raiders, won 14-6, Mt Smart Stadium
Round 9 vs Bye
Round 10 vs Penrith Panthers, lost 22-46, CUA Stadium
Round 11 vs Sydney Roosters, lost 12-38, Mt Smart Stadium
Round 12 vs Newcastle Knights, won 18-16, EnergyAustralia Stadium
Round 13 vs South Sydney Rabbitohs, lost 28-35, Mt Smart Stadium
Round 14 vs Cronulla Sharks, lost 8-24, Toyota Park
Round 15 vs Manly Sea Eagles, lost 14-20, Mt Smart Stadium
Round 16 vs Wests Tigers, won 28-26, Leichhardt Oval
Round 17 vs Bye
Round 18 vs North Queensland Cowboys, won 24-14, Mt Smart Stadium
Round 19 vs Canterbury Bulldogs, won 40-22, ANZ Stadium
Round 20 vs Melbourne Storm, won 8-6, Mt Smart Stadium
Round 21 vs South Sydney Rabbitohs, lost 16-18, ANZ Stadium
Round 22 vs Brisbane Broncos, won 16-12, Mt Smart Stadium
Round 23 vs Cronulla Sharks, won 18-4, Mt Smart Stadium
Round 24 vs St George Illawarra Dragons, lost 6-34, WIN Stadium
Round 25 vs Penrith Panthers, won 42-20, Mt Smart Stadium
Round 26 vs Parramatta Eels, won 28-6, Parramatta Stadium
Finals Week One vs Melbourne Storm, won 18-15, Olympic Park Stadium
Finals Week Two vs Sydney Roosters, won 30-13, Mt Smart Stadium
Finals Week Three vs Manly Sea Eagles, lost 6-32, Sydney Football Stadium

2009

Round 1 vs Parramatta Eels, won 26-18, Mt Smart Stadium
Round 2 vs Manly Sea Eagles, won 26-24, Brookvale Oval
Round 3 vs Brisbane Broncos, lost 10-26, Mt Smart Stadium
Round 4 vs South Sydney Rabbitohs, lost 16-22, Mt Smart Stadium
Round 5 vs Newcastle Knights, lost 22-24, EnergyAustralia Stadium
Round 6 vs Sydney Roosters, won 17-16 (a.e.t), Mt Smart Stadium
Round 7 vs Melbourne Storm, draw 14-14 (a.e.t), Olympic Park Stadium
Round 8 vs St George Illawarra Dragons, lost 11-12, WIN Stadium
Round 9 vs Bye
Round 10 vs North Queensland Cowboys, lost 12-34, Mt Smart Stadium
Round 11 vs Canberra Raiders, lost 12-38, Canberra Stadium
Round 12 vs Wests Tigers, won 14-0, Mt Smart Stadium
Round 13 vs Cronulla Sharks, lost 10-18, Toyota Park
Round 14 vs Newcastle Knights, won 13-0, Mt Smart Stadium
Round 15 vs Bye
Round 16 vs Gold Coast Titans, lost 12-28, Skilled Park
Round 17 vs Brisbane Broncos, lost 14-28, Suncorp Stadium
Round 18 vs Canterbury Bulldogs, lost 14-18, Mt Smart Stadium
Round 19 vs Sydney Roosters, won 30-24, Sydney Football Stadium
Round 20 vs St George Illawarra Dragons, lost 4-29, Mt Smart Stadium
Round 21 vs Penrith Panthers, draw 32-32 (a.e.t), CUA Stadium
Round 22 vs Gold Coast Titans, lost 10-30, Mt Smart Stadium
Round 23 vs Parramatta Eels, lost 4-40, Parramatta Stadium
Round 24 vs Canberra Raiders, won 34-20, Mt Smart Stadium
Round 25 vs Canterbury Bulldogs, lost 20-40, ANZ Stadium
Round 26 vs Melbourne Storm, lost 0-30, Mt Smart Stadium

2010

Round 1 vs Gold Coast Titans, lost 18-24, Skilled Park
Round 2 vs Cronulla Sharks, won 30-16, Mt Smart Stadium
Round 3 vs Brisbane Broncos, won 48-16, Suncorp Stadium
Round 4 vs Manly Sea Eagles, lost 6-14, Mt Smart Stadium
Round 5 vs Canterbury Bulldogs, won 30-24, ANZ Stadium
Round 6 vs Penrith Panthers, lost 12-40, Mt Smart Stadium
Round 7 vs Melbourne Storm, lost 6-40, Etihad Stadium
Round 8 vs Canberra Raiders, lost 16-23, Mt Smart Stadium
Round 9 vs Bye
Round 10 vs North Queensland Cowboys, won 24-12, Mt Smart Stadium
Round 11 vs South Sydney Rabbitohs, won 26-24, Mt Smart Stadium
Round 12 vs Wests Tigers, lost 6-50, Campbelltown Sports Stadium
Round 13 vs St George Illawarra Dragons, lost 20-22, Mt Smart Stadium
Round 14 vs Newcastle Knights, won 32-24, EnergyAustralia Stadium
Round 15 vs Bye
Round 16 vs Sydney Roosters, won 20-18, AMI Stadium
Round 17 vs Parramatta Eels, won 35-6, Mt Smart Stadium
Round 18 vs Penrith Panthers, won 12-6, CUA Stadium
Round 19 vs Melbourne Storm, won 13-6, Mt Smart Stadium
Round 20 vs South Sydney Rabbitohs, lost 28-38, ANZ Stadium
Round 21 vs Gold Coast Titans, lost 20-28, Mt Smart Stadium
Round 22 vs Cronulla Sharks, won 37-10, Toyota Stadium
Round 23 vs Newcastle Knights, won 22-10, Mt Smart Stadium
Round 24 vs Manly Sea Eagles, lost 16-19, Brookvale Oval
Round 25 vs Brisbane Broncos, won 36-4, Mt Smart Stadium
Round 26 vs Parramatta Eels, won 26-12, Parramatta Stadium
Finals Week One vs Gold Coast Titans, lost 16-28, Skilled Park

2011

2012

2013

2014

2015

2016

2017

2018

Notes

National Rugby League lists
Results
New Zealand rugby league lists